KTPX-TV (channel 44) is a television station licensed to Okmulgee, Oklahoma, United States, broadcasting the Ion Television network to the Tulsa area. It is owned and operated by the Ion Media subsidiary of the E.W. Scripps Company alongside NBC affiliate KJRH-TV (channel 2). KTPX-TV's offices are located on East Skelly Drive in Tulsa, and its transmitter is located near Mounds, Oklahoma.

History
The station first signed on the air on July 3, 1997, as KGLB-TV; it originally carried programming from Paxson Communications' infomercial service, the Infomall Television Network (inTV). The station became a charter owned-and-operated station of Pax TV (now Ion Television) when the network launched on August 31, 1998; on that date, the station changed its call letters to KTPX-TV (the KTPX calls were previously used by NBC affiliate KWES-TV in Midland, Texas from 1981 to 1993).

Sale to Scripps
On September 24, 2020, the Cincinnati-based E. W. Scripps Company announced that it would purchase Ion Media for $2.65 billion, with financing from Berkshire Hathaway. The purchase made KTPX-TV a sister station to NBC affiliate KJRH-TV (channel 2). The sale was completed on January 7, 2021.

On February 27, 2021, KTPX-DT2 began to simulcast KJRH's main schedule, and was re-mapped to channel 2.11.

Newscasts
Until 2005, KTPX aired rebroadcasts of NBC affiliate KJRH-TV's 6:00 p.m. and 10:00 p.m. newscasts at 6:30 p.m. and 10:30 p.m. on tape delay.

Technical information

Subchannels
The station's digital signal is multiplexed:

Analog-to-digital conversion
KTPX-TV shut down its analog signal, over UHF channel 44, on June 12, 2009, the official date in which full-power television stations in the United States transitioned from analog to digital broadcasts under federal mandate. The station's digital signal remained on its pre-transition UHF channel 28. Through the use of PSIP, digital television receivers display the station's virtual channel as its former UHF analog channel 44.

References

External links
Ion Television official website

Ion Television affiliates
Court TV affiliates
Grit (TV network) affiliates
Ion Mystery affiliates
Scripps News affiliates
E. W. Scripps Company television stations
Television channels and stations established in 1997
TPX-TV
1997 establishments in Oklahoma